Hans Gösta Gustaf Ekman (28 July 1939 – 1 April 2017) was a Swedish actor, comedian, and director.

Career
Ekman was born in Stockholm, Sweden, and was the son of the director Hasse Ekman and Agneta (née Wrangel). Ekman represented the third generation in a family of prominent Swedish actors. First in the line was his paternal grandfather, also named Gösta Ekman, followed by his father Hasse Ekman, a successful film director and actor. Ekman's theatrical family also included his brothers Stefan Ekman and Mikael Ekman, a stage director, and his niece, Sanna Ekman, an actress. He was married from 1989 to artist and film director Marie-Louise Ekman, previously Marie-Louise De Geer Bergenstråhle, née Fuchs. Ekman sometimes appeared in credits as Gösta Ekman Jr. to avoid being confused with his famous grandfather.

He was an assistant director to Per-Axel Branner, Hasse Ekman, Stig Olin, Bengt Ekerot and Ingmar Bergman from 1956 to 1961. Ekman started his acting career in the theaters, such as the Alléteatern from 1956 to 1957, Munkbroteatern in 1959 and the Stockholm City Theatre in 1960. He also appeared in several Swedish films, including the Jönssonligan series. He was most famous for his comedic works, especially his collaboration with the comic duo Hasse & Tage on stage and in films—where he often played the leading parts. His body of work, though, included a number of genres, including a series of dramatic police films, in which he played the famous fictional Swedish policeman Martin Beck.

While Ekman officially retired from stage and film work in 2003, he returned in 2005 to play leading parts in his wife's two films, Asta Nilssons sällskap and Pingvinresan. In 2007, he directed the play Gäckanden for the Swedish Royal Dramatic Theatre in Stockholm.

Personal life
He was married from 1963 to 1974 to Karl Gerhard's adopted daughter Fatima Svendsen (born 1944), with whom he had a son, Måns Ekman (born 1964). Subsequently, he was married from 1979 to 1987 to Pia Harahap (born 1955), with whom he had two adopted children. In 1989 he married Marie-Louise Ekman (born 1944). They were married until Gösta Ekman's death.

He died on 1 April 2017, at the age of 77.

Awards and nominations
Ekman won the Swedish film award Guldbagge Award in 1993 for his role as policeman Martin Beck in the Guldbagge-winning film The Man on the Balcony, based on the 1967 novel by Maj Sjöwall and Per Wahlöö. Ekman also won the special Hedersguldbaggen (Honorable Guldbagge) award in 2008 for his service to the Swedish film and theater industry.

Selected filmography

1956: Swing it, fröken - Erik
1962: Chans - Stefan
1962: Nils Holgerssons underbara resa - Student
1964: Svenska bilder (Hasse & Tage film) - Bengtsson
1964: Äktenskapsbrottaren - Herr Sixten
1965: Nattcafé (TV Movie) - Peter
1965: Festivitetssalongen - Blom - Journalist
1965: Docking the Boat (Hasse & Tagefilm) - Lennart
1965: Niklasons (TV series) - Martin (1965)
1966: Woman of Darkness - Per / Son-Hanna's husband
1968: Lådan
1968: Jag älskar, du älskar - Stan
1968: I huvet på en gammal gubbe (Out of an Old Man's Head) (Hasse & Tage film) - Student
1969: Som natt och dag - Rikard
1969: Duett för kannibaler - Tomas
1969: Spader, Madame! (TV Movie) - Johan Isak
1971: Niklas och figuren - Micke's Father
1971: The Apple War (Hasse & Tage film) - Sten Wall, PR-man
1972: The Man Who Quit Smoking (Hasse & Tage film) - Dante Alighieri
1972: Experimentlek
1973: Kvartetten som sprängdes (The Quartet That Broke Up) (TV Mini-Series) - Petrus Anker
1974: Dunderklumpen! - Dummy (voice)
1975: Egg! Egg! A Hardboiled Story (Hasse & Tage film) - The Son
1975: Release the Prisoners to Spring (Hasse & Tage film) - Fängelsedirektören
1976: Face to Face - Mikael Strömberg
1976: En dåres försvarstal (TV Mini-Series) - Axel
1978: The Adventures of Picasso (The Adventures of Picasso) (Hasse & Tage film) - Picasso
1978: En vandring i solen - Tore
1979: En kärleks sommar - David Jernberg
1979: Lucie - Gerner
1979: Farbrorn som inte ville va' stor (TV Series short) - Ragnar / Narrator (voice)
1980: To Be a Millionaire - Stickan
1980: Sällskapsresan eller Finns det svenskt kaffe på grisfesten - Hotel Cleaner (uncredited)
1981: Från och med herr Gunnar Papphammar - Herr Gunnar Papphammar
1981: SOPOR (Hasse & Tage film) - John Smith (Pseudonym)
1981: Varning för Jönssonligan - Charel-Ingvar 'Sickan' Jönsson
1982: The Simple-Minded Murder (Hasse & Tage film) - The New Driver
1982: En flicka på halsen - Kurt
1982: Jönssonligan och Dynamit-Harry - Charles-Ingvar 'Sickan' Jönsson
1982: Gräsänklingar (One Week Bachelors) - Gary
1983: Kalabaliken i Bender - Karl XII
1983: P&B - Guest at Restaurant
1984: The Inside Man - Stig Larsson
1984: Jönssonligan får guldfeber - Charles-Ingvar 'Sickan' Jönsson
1984: Magister Flykt (TV Series short) - Narrator (voice)
1985: Dödspolare - Torbjörn 'Tobbe' Skytt
1986: Morrhår och ärtor (also director) - Håna
1986: Jönssonligan dyker upp igen - Charles-Ingvar 'Sickan' Jönsson
1988: Vargens tid - Bjelke
1989: Kronvittnet - Lambert
1989: Jönssonligan på Mallorca - Charles-Ingvar 'Sickan' Jönsson
1990: Den hemliga vännen - The friend
1991: Underjordens hemlighet - Carson
1991: Duo Jag (TV Movie) - The thin man
1992: Vennerman och Winge (TV Series)
1993: The Fire Engine That Disappeared - Martin Beck
1993: Roseanna - Martin Beck
1993: Murder at the Savoy - Martin Beck
1993: The Man on the Balcony - Martin Beck
1994: The Police Murderer - Martin Beck
1994: Stockholm Marathon - Martin Beck
1995: En på miljonen - Direktör Callert
1996: Nu är pappa trött igen - Fadern
1997: Adam & Eva (1997) - Gösta Ekman (uncredited)
1997: Ogifta par ...en film som skiljer sig - Gösta Ekman
2000: Det blir aldrig som man tänkt sig - Tage Olsson
2000: Soldater i månsken (TV Mini-Series) - Gunnar
2001: Puder - Vippan
2001: En fot i graven (TV Series) - Viktor Melldrov
2003: Illusive Tracks - Pompe
2005: Asta Nilssons sällskap - Den välklädde mannen
2005: Loranga, Masarin & Dartanjang - Dartanjang (voice)

References

Sources

External links
 

1939 births
2017 deaths
Male actors from Stockholm
Swedish male stage actors
Swedish comedians
Swedish male film actors
Swedish male television actors
Swedish film directors
Swedish composers
Swedish male composers
Swedish television directors
Swedish screenwriters
Swedish male screenwriters
20th-century Swedish male actors
21st-century Swedish male actors
Best Actor Guldbagge Award winners